Caleb Amankwah (born 15 October 1997) is a Ghanaian professional footballer who plays as a defender for Ghanaian Premier league side Accra Hearts of Oak.

Career 
Amankwah moved to Accra Hearts of Oak on 12 March 2021 on a free transfer. Amankwah previously played for Aduana Stars and WAFA.

Honours 
Hearts of Oak

 Ghana Premier League: 2020–21
Ghanaian FA Cup: 2021

References

External links 
 
 

Living people
1997 births
Ghanaian footballers
Association football defenders
West African Football Academy players
Aduana Stars F.C. players
Accra Hearts of Oak S.C. players
Ghana A' international footballers
2022 African Nations Championship players